Clemensia panthera is a moth of the family Erebidae first described by William Schaus in 1896. It is found in São Paulo, Brazil.

References

External links
Original description: Journal of the New York Entomological Society.

Cisthenina
Moths described in 1896